Bruchterveld is a village near the town of Hardenberg, Overijssel, the Netherlands. There is a village house and a football association. It has three churches: Dutch reformed, Dutch reformed freed and Reformed.

History 
It was first mentioned in 1868 Bruchter Veld, and means "field belonging to Brucht". It was a heath and peat area which was excavated during the 19th and early 20th century.

References 

Populated places in Overijssel
Hardenberg